The Bayer designations U Carinae and u Carinae are distinct. Due to technical limitations, both designations link here. For the star

 U Carinae, HD 95109, a Cepheid variable star
 u Carinae, HD 94510, a K-type giant star

See also
 υ Carinae, Upsilon Carinae

Carinae, A
Carina (constellation)